Awara broth (Bouillon d'awara in French and Bouyon wara in Guianan Creole) is a typical Guianan Creole stew, made up of many ingredients that are combined with the pulp of the fruit of Awara tree, reduced at length beforehand in a pot. The stew can include salt ham, bacon, salt beef, pork snout, salt cod, smoked fish, fresh seafood like crabs and prawns, roast chicken and vegetables like cabbage, spinach, eggplant and chile peppers.

A proverb says : "If you eat the broth of awara ... to Guiana you'll come back ..."

Preparation
The dish is prepared from the pulp of the Awara fruit and is typically mixed with smoked chicken and smoked fish.

The stew can take several days to prepare. At the end of the preparation, the awara broth is orange to light brown. It is usually accompanied by white rice.

Christian holidays
Considered a national dish and a sign of hospitality towards guests, it is often prepared for Easter and Pentecost.

See also

 Awara
 French Guianan cuisine

References

French Guianan cuisine
Chicken soups
Fish stews
Easter food
Ham dishes
Bacon dishes
Eggplant dishes
Chili pepper dishes
Cabbage dishes
Pentecost
Stews